This article lists the squads for 2008 AFF Championship. Players marked (c) were named as captain for their national squad.

Group A

Indonesia
Head Coach: Benny Dollo

Singapore
Head Coach:  Radojko Avramovic

Myanmar
Head Coach:  Marcos Antonio Falopa

Cambodia
Head Coach: Prak Sovannara

Group B

Malaysia
Head Coach: B. Sathianathan

Thailand
Head Coach :  Peter Reid

Vietnam
Head Coach:  Henrique Calisto

Laos
Head Coach: Saysana Savatdy

References

AFF Championship squads
Squads